Stewart Lynn "Stu" Blusson,  (born 1939) is a Canadian geologist, helicopter pilot, businessman and philanthropist. He co-discovered billion-dollar Ekati Diamond Mine, 300 kilometres from Yellowknife, Northwest Territories, Canada. He is President of Archon Minerals Ltd. In 2002, Blusson donated key start-up funds necessary for Quest University Canada in Squamish, British Columbia. In 2006, Blusson donated $10 million for the Archon X PRIZE to develop a quick and inexpensive way to sequence the human genome.  Blusson had a net worth of $660 million CDN in 2006.

Early life 
Blusson was born in Vancouver, British Columbia. He completed an undergraduate degree at the University of British Columbia (1960) and a doctorate in geology at the University of California, Berkeley (1964).

Career 
After school, he joined the federal Geological Survey of Canada, leading regional geological mapping and research programs in the central Yukon and parts of British Columbia. During that time he survived a serious helicopter crash and a Grizzly bear attack. In 1969, Chuck Fipke, a geologist, needed to be rescued from the side of a mountain where he had been stranded for close to a week. Blusson sent in the helicopter pilot that saved him. From this first encounter, Fipke and Blusson became friends and prospecting partners.

He left the Geological Survey in 1979 to explore the modes of formation of mineral deposits from Mexico to the Arctic. He discovered a number of important occurrences of gold, copper and other metals.

Blusson married his wife, Marilyn, in 1980.

In 1981, he and Fipke began searching for diamonds in the Northwest Territories, concentrating their search on indicator minerals commonly associated with kimberlite, a host rock for diamond. They found kimberlitic indicator minerals near Lac de Gras in the Northwest Territories in 1985, and their first kimberlite at Point Lake in 1991.

In 1998, Ekati opened, a joint venture between BHP Diamonds Inc. (51%), Dia Met Minerals (29%), Fipke (10%), and Blusson (10%). Blusson's net worth in 2002 was estimated to be $295 million (US).

In 2004, he was appointed as an Officer of the Order of Canada and was presented with the Logan Medal, Geological Association of Canada's highest honour. In 2012, he was awarded the Queen Elizabeth II Diamond Jubilee Medal.

Archon X Prize 
In 2006, Blusson donated the largest medical prize in history, $10 million (US), for the Archon X Prize. The prize is named after the ancient Archean Craton core plate beneath Canada where diamonds were discovered. The prize will go to the person or group that can develop a quick (100 people in 10 days) and inexpensive way to sequence a human genome.

Philanthropy 
 1998- $50-million (Cdn) to the University of British Columbia for genetic research performed by Michael Smith, Nobel laureate
 2002- $32-million to Quest University Canada in Squamish, British Columbia
 2006- $5-million (Cdn) to Vancouver Aquarium for an educational program
 2006- $10-million (Cdn) to the Blusson Spinal Cord Centre which houses ICORD, Vancouver Coastal Health and the Rick Hansen Institute, and is backed by activist Rick Hansen
 2006- $10-million (US) to Archon X PRIZE
 2007- $12-million (Cdn) to the Faculty of Health Sciences at Simon Fraser University
 2016- $11-million (Cdn) to the Stewart Blusson Quantum Matter Institute at the University of British Columbia

References 

Sources
X marks the spotlight for elusive benefactor
Officer of the Order of Canada
UBC grad donates $50 million to alma mater
Ekati Pioneer is Title Sponsor for Largest Medical Prize in History
This Wall Street Journal- Celebrity Genome Project?
SFU receives record $12-million gift

External links 
 Recipients of the Logan Medal
 Stuart Blusson from the GSC to Ekati

1939 births
Living people
Businesspeople from Vancouver
Canadian geologists
Canadian mining businesspeople
20th-century Canadian philanthropists
Canadian prospectors
Geological Survey of Canada personnel
Officers of the Order of Canada
University of British Columbia Faculty of Science alumni
UC Berkeley College of Letters and Science alumni
Logan Medal recipients
21st-century Canadian philanthropists